Qala T'uxu or Qala Tuqu (Aymara qala stone, t'uxu window, hole in the wall, tuqu goitre, "stone window" or "stone goitre", also spelled Khala Thojo, Qala Tuju) is a mountain in the Cordillera Real in the Andes of Bolivia, about  high. It is located in the La Paz Department, Los Andes Province, Batallas Municipality, Chachacomani Canton. It is situated south-west of the mountains Wila Lluxi and Warawarani and north-west of the mountain Phaq'u Kiwuta.

See also
 Chachakumani
 Janq'u Uyu
 Kunturiri
 Q'ara Quta

References 

Mountains of La Paz Department (Bolivia)